A pastoral is a work in the genre of literature, art, and music known as the pastoral genre, that depicts the simple life of a shepherd in an idealised manner.

Pastoral may also refer to:

Animal husbandry 
 Pastoral farming, the branch of agriculture concerned with the raising of livestock
 Pastoralism, a form of animal husbandry where livestock are released onto large vegetated outdoor lands (pastures) for grazing, historically by nomadic people

Arts and entertainment
 Pastoral: To Die in the Country, a 1974 Japanese film 
 Pastoral (theatre of Soule), a traditional kind of play from the Basque Country
 Pastoral (Shute novel), by Nevil Shute
 Pastoral (Alexis novel), by André Alexis
 Pastoral (album), by Gazelle Twin, 2018
 Pastoral, Beethoven's 6th Symphony
 Pastoral, Beethoven's Piano Sonata No. 15
 "Pastoral", a song by The Jesus Lizard from the 1990 album Head
 Pastoral, a 2000 poetry collection by Carl Phillips
 English Pastoral School, a group of English composers of classical music working during the early to mid 20th century

Other uses
 Pastoral letter, or pastoral, an open letter by a bishop to the clergy or laity of a diocese

See also

Pastorale (disambiguation)
Pastoral Symphony (disambiguation)
Pastor, an ordained leader of a Christian congregation
Pastoral care, an ancient model of emotional and spiritual support
Pastourelle, a typically Old French lyric form